Fróði (Middle High German: Vruote)  is the name of a number of legendary Danish kings in various texts including Beowulf, Snorri Sturluson's Prose Edda and his  Ynglinga saga,  Saxo Grammaticus' Gesta Danorum, and the Grottasöngr. A Danish king by this name also appears as a minor character in the Middle High German epic Rabenschlacht. The name is possibly an eponym for the god Freyr.

The Fróði of the Grottasöngr is said to be the father of Fridleif and the son of Skjöld in whose beer king Fjölnir drowned (according to Ynglinga saga). Snorri Sturluson here and in the Skáldskaparmál make this Fróði the contemporary of emperor Augustus and comments on the peacefulness of his reign, referred to as Fróði's Peace, suggesting a relationship to the birth of Christ. Though Icelandic sources make this Fróði a very early Danish king, in Gesta Danorum (Book 5), Saxo puts him late in his series of rulers, though including the chronological equation with Augustus and mentioning the birth of Christ.
The Fróði who, according to Ynglinga saga and Gesta Danorum, was the father of Halfdan. He would have lived in the 5th or 6th century. He appears to be the same king who later in the Ynglinga saga aided the Swedish king Ongenþeow in defeating the thrall Tunni. Because of this, Egil and his son Ottar (Ohthere) became tributaries to the Danish king.
Fróði the father of Ingjald, who in Beowulf is Froda the father of Ingeld and king of the Heathobards. The existence of the Heathobards has been forgotten in Norse texts and this Fróði there sometimes appears as the brother of Halfdan with the long hostility between Heathobards and Danes becoming a family feud between Halfdan and his brother Fróði. Fróði kills Halfdan and is himself slain by Halfdan's sons Helgi (Halga) and Hroar (Hrothgar). (In Arngrímur Jónsson's Latin summary to the lost Skjöldunga saga the names Fróði and Ingjald are interchanged. Saxo Grammaticus (Book 6) makes this Fróði instead to be a very late legendary king, the son of Fridleif son of Saxo's late peaceful Fróði. Saxo knows some of the story of this feud but nothing of any relationship to Halfdan. Instead Saxo relates how this Fróði was slain by Saxons and how, after a marriage alliance between his son Ingel and a Saxon princess to heal the feud, Ingel opened it again at the urging of an old warrior, just as the hero Beowulf prophesies of Ingjald in the poem Beowulf.
A legend from Ydre in the South Swedish highlands tells that a king known as Frode was killed by Urkon, the same cow that created Lake Sommen.

The form Fróði is still in use in Icelandic and Faroese and appears Latinized as Frotho or Frodo. This form of the name is used by J. R. R. Tolkien in The Lord of the Rings for the main character. Alternative Anglicizations are Frode, Fródi, Fróthi and Frodhi. The Danish, Norwegian and Swedish form is Frode. The meaning of the name is "clever, learned, wise".

The number of men with the name Frode in Scandinavia as of 2008: Norway (ca.) 11384, Denmark (ca.) 1413, Sweden (ca.) 307.

The Gesta Danorum describes six Frothos.

Frotho I
Frotho II
Frotho III
Frotho IV
Frotho V
Frotho VI

See also
Elgfróði

References

Mythological kings of Denmark
English heroic legends
Legendary Danish people
Scyldings
Characters in Beowulf